The SscA RNA (Secondary Structure Conserved A) gene was identified computationally in AT-rich hyperthermophiles using QRNA bioinformatics software. SscA is 97 nucleotides in length and is of unknown function.

The predicted distribution of SscA RNA is currently restricted to the genera pyrococcus and thermococcus (see Rfam page).

Other RNAs identified with SscA include HgcC, HgcE, HgcF and HgcG.

References

External links 
 

Non-coding RNA